Min Shin Saw was an early 14th-century governor of Thayet in the Pinya Kingdom. He was a son of King Kyawswa of Pagan and the father of King Swa Saw Ke of Ava, Queen Saw Omma of Pinya.

Brief
Min Shin Saw was the second son of King Kyawswa of Pagan and his chief queen Saw Soe. His father was overthrown by the three brothers of Myinsaing (Athinhkaya, Yazathingyan and Thihathu) on 17 December 1297. The three brothers executed Kyawswa on 10 May 1299 but with the dowager queen Pwa Saw's advice, they agreed to appoint the sons of Kyawswa by his queen Saw Soe, Saw Hnit and Min Shin Saw viceroys of Pagan (Bagan) and Thayet respectively.

Both Saw Hnit and Min Shin Saw pledged allegiance to the three brothers, who were now co-kings of the Myinsaing Kingdom. Min Shin Saw married Shin Myat Hla of Prome, his second cousin and the niece of the brothers. In 1315, the Myinsaing Kingdom split into two parts, and Min Shin Saw's territory became part of the Pinya Kingdom. His region bordered the western kingdom of Arakan (present-day Rakhine State). Min Shin Saw and his family were taken to Launggyet on 7 January 1334 by the Arakanese army which raided Thayet. The family was treated well at Launggyet where the children were educated by one of the most learned monks there. Circa 1343, the entire family was allowed to return to Pinya where her father was reappointed to his old position at Thayet.

Ancestry
The following is the ancestry of Min Shin Saw as reported by the Hmannan Yazawin chronicle (Hmannan Vol. 1 2003: 360, 402–403). He was descended from Pagan kings from both sides. His parents were second cousins, once removed.

Notes

References

Bibliography
 
 
 
 

Myinsaing dynasty
Pinya dynasty